George Neville or Nevill may refer to:
George Neville (bishop) (c. 1432–1476), archbishop of York
George Nevill, 4th Baron Bergavenny (c. 1440–1492), 4th and de jure 2nd Baron Bergavenny
George Nevill, 5th Baron Bergavenny (c. 1469–1535), 5th and de jure 3rd Baron Bergavenny, Lord Warden of the Cinque Ports
George Nevill, 11th Baron Bergavenny (bef. 1641–1666), de facto English peer
George Nevill, 12th Baron Bergavenny (1665–1695), English peer
George Nevill, 13th Baron Bergavenny (c. 1659–1720/21), English peer
George Nevill, 14th Baron Bergavenny (1702–1723), English peer
George Neville, 1st Baron Latimer (died 1469), English peer
George Nevill, 1st Earl of Abergavenny (1727–1785), English peer
George Neville, 1st Duke of Bedford (1457–1483), English nobleman
George Neville (Royal Navy officer) (1850–1923), Royal Navy admiral
George Neville (priest) (died 1588), Archdeacon of Carlisle